Oğuz Abadan (born 12 June 1950) is a Turkish musician born in Ankara. His music life began when he started playing the mandolin during his primary school years. At the age of twelve, he started to learn how to play the guitar. After playing along with several different amateur bands during his youth, he carried on with professionals: he has appeared in orchestras, such at the one headed by Cemil Başaran as guitarist.

Biography 
After completing his education at Ankara's Gazi University Music Department as a violinist, he went to the United States to study harmony at Berklee College. Later, he visited and produced music within several different countries in Europe. After working as professional bass player in Germany, he moved to France where he joined Moğollar (Mongols), a then-active Turkish band in Paris.

Returning home to Turkey, he started working at the Ankara Metropolitan Municipality Urban Orchestra as the arranger and bassist. Meanwhile, he carried on with his own orchestra, which he had set up bearing his name. In the following years he moved to Istanbul, where he currently resides. He has conducted many orchestras in many countries, carried out various concerts and studio works, and has collaborated with many prominent vocalists. He produces film music and has two books published on music theory.

He is the father of pianist Ayşegül Abadan and bassist Yağız Abadan.

Discography 
As the composer, arranger, and music director he has produced albums with many artists, including
 Cem Karaca (Töre)
 Ahmet Kaya (Şafak Türküsü)
 Okay Temiz (Derviş)
 Zerrin Özer (Dayanamıyorum)
 Yoshitaka Minami (Japonya) (Lovely Girl)
 Banu (Kırbağ Gün Kavuşurken)
 Tanju Okan (Çaresiz, Özür Diliyorum)
 Fatih Kısaparmak (Tomurcuk)
 Ferhat Tunç (Yaşamak Direnmektir, Istanbul Konserleri)
 Siwan Perver (Naze, Zembilfrosh, Me Cıkır)
 Kawa
 Neşe Karaböcek (Çiçekdağ)

Filmography

Film Music 

 Suna 2007
 Aşka Tövbe 1998
 Dönüş Yemini 1996
 Şövalye, Pamuk Prenses ve Hain 1996
 Aşk Üzerine Söylenmemiş Herşey 1996
 Yer Çekimli Aşklar 1996
 Oy Deposu 1994
 Bir Yanımız Bahar Bahçe 1994
 Sekizinci Saat 1994
 Sessiz Çığlık 1994
 Kadere 45 Var 1994
 Günah Tohumu 1994
 Ateş Üstünde Yürümek 1991
 Devlerin Ölümü 1990
 Aşk Üçgeni 1990
 Acılar Paylaşılmaz 1989
 Fotoğraflar 1989
 Yağmur Başladı 1989
 Ağlama 1986
 Mavi Mavi 1986
 Gurbetci Saban 1985

Film Music As Musical Director

 Muhsin Bey  1987
 Gülüm Benim  1986
 Fatmagül'ün Sucu Ne 1986
 Deli Deli Küpeli
 Garip 1986
 Mavi Yolculuk 1986
 Uzun Bir Gece 1986
 Yarin Aglayacagim 1986
 Halkali Köle 1986
 Saban Pabucu Yarim 1985
 Katmadeger Saban 1985
 Keriz 1985
 Sosyete Saban 1985
 Sendul Saban 1985
 Postaci 1984
 Sabaniye 1984
 Tutku 1984
 Bir Sevgili Istiyorum 1984
 Ortadirek Şaban 1984
 Atla Gel Saban 1984
 Bedel 1984
 Carikli Milyoner 1983
 Seni Seviyorum 1983
 Kilibik 1983
 En Büyük Saban 1983
 Iffet 1982
 Doktor Civanim 1982
 Islak Günes 1982
 Tomruk 1982
 Arkadasim 1982
 Gazap Rüzgari 1982
 Askalarin En Guzeli 1982
 Cicek Abbas 1982
 Yürek Yarasi 1982
 Bas Belasi 1982
 Mine 1982

Documentaries 

 Memduh Ün - Ustasız Ustalar 2008
 Halit Refig Sineması Uzerine 2007
 Kameramandan Görüntü Yönetmenine 2006
 Penceremde Sardunyalar 2004
 Işığın Peşinde Anadolu 1993
 Cumhuriyete Kanat Gerenler 1991
 Tahta At 1990
 Zincir 1989
 Bitlis 1989
 From Tushba To Van 1988

Television Film Music 

 Nefes Alamıyorum 1996
 Köstekli Saat 1994

Musics for Television Serials

 Su Sinekleri 2001
 Geceler 1996
 Suçlu Kim 1994
 Zamanda Yolculuk 1995
 Bizim Mahalle 1993
 Kederli Yıllar 1994
 Üçüzler 1993
 Karşı Show 1993
 Prensesin Böylesi 1992
 At Kestanesi 1991
 Kara Elmas 1990
 077 Hızır - Acil Servis 1988
 Uğurlugil Ailesi 1988

Television Shows

 Bizden Size (TRT) 
 Susam Sokağı (TRT) 
 Salı Pazarı (Star TV) 
 Ajda Pekkan Sizlerle (Kanal 6) 
 Cumartesi Eğlencesi  (Star TV) 
 Pazarlık (Star TV) 
 Bu Hafta Pafta Pafta (Kanal D)

Books 
 Teori 1- Notasyon ve Diziler (Teori 1)  Pan Yayıncılık
 Teori 2- Aralıklar ve Akorlar (Teori 2) Pan Yayıncılık

References 
 SinemaTurk.com - Filmography of Oğuz Abadan

External links 
 Oğuz Abadan official website
 Brief of biography of Oğuz Abadan

1950 births
Living people
Turkish male songwriters